Jonathan-Elias Weiske (born in Berlin on 4 February 1996) is a German film and television actor and voice actor.

Jonathan was born in Berlin son of Oliver Betke and Claudia Weiske, an artistic family, with his father being a film/television/theatre actor who had also appeared in musicals in addition to working also a synchronspeecher (voice over) and a photographer. Jonathan's mother also worked as an actress who had appeared amongst others in Gute Zeiten, schlechte Zeiten in the role Elke Opitz. She had also appeared in a number of theater productions in Berlin (in Theater am Kurfürstendamm), Dresden and in Hamburg.

Jonathan started as a child actor at age five. He had his screen debut appearing in the series Herzschlag-Die Retterand two years later in the short film Jesus Christ, directed by U. Preatel. He became well-known through the series Fünf Sterne that ran from 2005 to 2008 on ZDF, where he starting as  a 9-year old, he played the character Martin Amann, who after his family faces financial difficulties, moves to Berlin to live with his mother to begin a new live.

In 2009, he played in the made-for-TV film Sind denn alle Männer Schweine? broadcast on Sat.1. He plays the role of Niklas Nielsen in the film. Other film roles included Mandy will ans Meer for  the channel ZDF and Bitte nicht stören for arte.

He also made voice overs for the character Tom in the children's series D.I.E. Detektive im Einsatz directed by N. Spier for the channel Super RTL in addition to popular American TV series like "NCIS: Los Angeles" and "Grey's Anatomy".

In popular culture
Jonathan Elias Weiske voiced over the character "Frodo" for The Lord of the Rings: Aragorn's Quest video game (in German Die Abenteuer von Aragorn)

Filmography

Film 
 2001: Herzschlag – Die Retter as Guido 
 2003: Jesus Christ as Christian
 2005-2008: Fünf Sterne as Martin Amann
 2008: Typisch Mann! as Leon
 2009: Sind denn alle Männer Schweine? as Niklas Nielsen
 2010: Bitte nicht stören as Tim
 2011: Mandy will ans Meer
 2014: Alkohol? Kenn dein Limit! as Niklas
 2015: SOKO Wismar - Gras drüber as Joris Thiel
 2015: Alles was zählt as Kevin
 2015: Allein gegen die Zeit as Phil
 2016: Notruf Hafenkante - Engel as Jonas Ravenstein
 2016: Kleidercode as Basti
 2016: Der Lehrer as Niklas Hardenberg
 2016: Ellas Baby as Gregor
 2017: Jannik as Dennis
 2017: Respringendo as Max
 2017: Der Kriminalist as Krys
 2017: Das Pubertier as Paul
 2017: Der Lehrer as Niklas Hardenberg
 2017: Immigration Game as Yob
 2018: AU/RA - Panic Room as Cleaner
 2018: Mad Max - Beauty of the Heart as Yob
 2018: Notruf Hafenkante as Michail Grigorov
 2018: Wake Up Call as Mike
 2018: Aimbot as Kai Neumann
 2018: Grenzgänger as Joachim "Dschockie" Bergmeister
 2018: Misfit - The movie as Justin Himmelmann
 2019: Die jungen Ärzte as Viktor Lehmann
 2019: Black Forest Witch as Hermann
 2019: Circle of Life as Max Schröter
 2019: Starnet as Lucas
 2019: Leipzig Homicide as Daniel Behrens
 2019: Die Wiederkehr as Thorben
 2019: A War Poem as Pawel
 2020: Unter Uns as Sebastian Hoffmann
 2020: Cologne P.D. as Jan-Philip Curtius
 2020: Alarm für Cobra 11 - Die Autobahnpolizei as Bennie Kaiser
 2020: Jungfernfahrt as Niko
 2020: Blutige Anfänger as Kai
 2021: Nix Festes as Mateo
 2021: Letzte Spur Berlin as Daniel Lamprecht
 2021: The Vagabonds as Leon

Voice-over 
 2009: D.I.E Detektive im Einsatz / Kid's Detectives (Tom)
 2009-2010: The Lord of the Rings: Aragorn's Quest (as Frodo)
 2010: Grey's Anatomy (Boy)
 2011: NCIS: Los Angeles (Boy)
 2012: Der kleine Prinz (Commander)
 2012: Grey’s Anatomy (Boy)
 2016: Allein gegen die Zeit (Phil)
 2016: Goosebumps (Boy)

References

External links 
 

1996 births
Male actors from Berlin
Living people